Andrea Tummiolo (born 20 March 1984) is an Italian footballer who plays for Igea Virtus.

External links

1984 births
Living people
People from Sciacca
Italian footballers
A.C.R. Messina players
Valenzana Mado players
Serie A players
Association football midfielders
Footballers from Sicily
Sportspeople from the Province of Agrigento